Youngky Kim from the Networks Business, Samsung Electronics, Suwon, South Korea was named Fellow of the Institute of Electrical and Electronics Engineers (IEEE) in 2015 for leadership in mobile communication systems.

References

Fellow Members of the IEEE
Living people
Year of birth missing (living people)
Place of birth missing (living people)
Samsung people